25I-NB34MD (NB34MD-2C-I) is a derivative of the phenethylamine hallucinogen 2C-I, which acts as a potent partial agonist for the human 5-HT2A receptor, and presumably has similar properties to 2C-I. It has a binding affinity of 0.67nM at the human 5-HT2A receptor, making it several times weaker than its positional isomer 25I-NBMD and a similar potency to 25I-NBF.

Legality

Hungary
Illegal.

Japan
Illegal.

Sweden
The Riksdag added 25I-NB34MD to Narcotic Drugs Punishments Act under Swedish schedule I ("substances, plant materials and fungi which normally do not have medical use") as of June 9, 2015, published by Medical Products Agency (MPA) in regulation LVFS 2015:4 listed as 25I-NB34MD, and 2-(4-jodo-2,5-dimetoxifenyl)-N-[(3,4-metylendioxifenyl)metyl]etanamin.

United Kingdom

Analogues and derivatives

References 

Benzodioxoles
Designer drugs
Iodoarenes
2C (psychedelics)